General elections were held in Belgium on 23 May 1965. The result was a victory for the Christian Social Party, which won 77 of the 212 seats in the Chamber of Representatives and 44 of the 106 seats in the Senate. Voter turnout was 91.6%. Elections for the nine provincial councils were also held.

The elections followed the implementation of the 1962 language laws. As a result, the Flemish nationalist People's Union made big gains, as well as the new Democratic Front of the Francophones which was founded as a response to the language laws.

The election also followed the founding of the Party for Freedom and Progress, succeeding the Liberal Party. The new party aimed to reach a broader voter base, in which it succeeded by more than doubling its number of seats.

Despite both government parties losing seats, they retained their sizeable majority and continued governing.

Results

Chamber of Representatives

Senate

Constituencies
The distribution of seats among the electoral districts was as follows for the Chamber of Representatives. Seats were reapportioned among the districts due to population growth, which was stronger in Flanders than in Wallonia, and due to several municipalities having been changed to another province following the 1962 language laws. For example, the Comines-Warneton municipalities were transferred from Ypres (West Flanders) to the newly created arrondissement of Mouscron (Hainaut), causing Ypres to lose one seat and Tournai-Ath-Mouscron to gain one seat.

References

1965 elections in Belgium
May 1965 events in Europe